The December 1946 Bavarian state election was held on 1 December 1946 to elect the members of the First Bavarian Landtag. The election came after the dissolution of the Bavarian Constituent Assembly after the passing of the Constitution, which stipulated that a democratically elected Landtag would elect the Minister-President. It saw Bavaria's first democratically chosen Minister-President since Heinrich Held.

Background
Bavaria was completely occupied by American troops at the end of April 1945. General George S. Patton appointed Christian democrat Fritz Schäffer as interim Minister-President on 28 May 1945, before being dismissed by General Dwight D. Eisenhower on 28 September 1945 due to Schäffer's past anti-Semitic positions, and hiring of ex-Nazis within his administration.

The ministry was then handed over to social democrat Wilhelm Hoegner, who oversaw the creation of a new Bavarian constitution in the spring and summer of 1946. To aid him, the Advisory State Committee was formed, with its members being appointed by the political parties or the state. The body was eventually dissolved, with direct elections being called for a Constituent State Assembly to oversee the passage of the Constitution. After the Constitution had been ratified by the State Assembly, the body was dissolved and elections were called for the first official Landtag since the Weimar Republic. On the same day of the Landtag elections, Bavaria held a plebiscite whether to affirm the newly written Constitution.

Results
The Wilhelm Hoegner regime had been installed by the American military forces in Germany and did not reflect the popular opinion of Bavarians. The Constitution stated that the Minister-President was to be elected by the Landtag, thus when the CSU gained a majority of the seats, the SPD entered a coalition with the CSU and WAV, with a CSU Minister-President, Hans Ehard. In September 1947, the SPD withdrew its ministers and the CSU abandoned its partnership with WAV, forming a sole majority government. This was also the first election in post-war Bavaria that introduced the ten-percent rule, in which a seat would only be allotted to a candidate if they received at least ten percent of the vote in any given constituency. The KPD, while gaining a net positive in overall votes, failed to meet this requirement in any constituency and lost all of their seats.

Parties
The table below lists parties represented in the Constituent State Assembly of Bavaria.

|-
! colspan="2" | Party
! Votes
! %
! +/-
! Seats 
! +/-
! Seats %
|-
| bgcolor=| 
| align=left | Christian Social Union (CSU)
| align=right| 1,593,908	
| align=right| 52.3
| align=right|  6%
| align=right| 104
| align=right|  5
| align=right| 56.1
|-
| bgcolor=| 
| align=left | Social Democratic Party (SPD)
| align=right| 871,760
| align=right| 28.6
| align=right|  0.2%
| align=right| 54
| align=right|  3
| align=right| 30
|-
| bgcolor= | 
| align=left | Economic Reconstruction Union (WAV)
| align=right| 225,404
| align=right| 5.1
| align=right|  2.3%
| align=right| 13
| align=right|  5
| align=right| 7.2
|-
| bgcolor=| 
| align=left | Communist Party (KPD)
| align=right| 185,023
| align=right| 6.1
| align=right|  0.8%
| align=right| 0
| align=right|  9
| align=right| 0
|-
| bgcolor=| 
| align=left | Free Democratic Party (FDP)
| align=right| 172,242
| align=right| 5.7
| align=right|  3.2%
| align=right| 9
| align=right|  6
| align=right| 5
|-
! align=right colspan=2| Total
! align=right| 3,048,337
! align=right| 100.0
! align=right| 
! align=right| 180
! align=right| ±0
! align=right|  
|-
! align=right colspan=2| Voter turnout
! align=right| 
! align=right| 75.7
! align=right|  3.6
! align=right| 
! align=right| 
! align=right|
|-
|colspan=8 align=left|Source: Statistik Bayern and Historisches Lexikon Bayerns 
|}

References

External links
 Historisches Lexikon Bayerns
 House of Bavarian Elections

1946 elections in Germany
Elections in Bavaria